Broken Arrow is a 1950 American Western film directed by Delmer Daves and starring James Stewart, Jeff Chandler and Debra Paget. The film is based on historical figures, but fictionalizes their story in dramatized form. It was nominated for three Academy Awards, and won a Golden Globe Award for Best Film Promoting International Understanding. Film historians have said that the film was one of the first major Westerns since the Second World War to portray the Indians sympathetically.

Plot
Tom Jeffords comes across a wounded, 14-year-old Apache boy dying from buckshot wounds in his back. Jeffords gives the boy water and treats his wounds. The boy's tribesmen appear and are initially hostile, but decide to let Jeffords go free. However, when a group of gold prospectors approaches, the Apache gag Jeffords and tie him to a tree. Helpless, he watches as they attack the prospectors and torture the survivors. The warriors then let him go, but warn him not to enter Apache territory again.

When Jeffords returns to Tucson, he encounters a prospector who escaped the ambush. He corrects a man's exaggerated account of the attack, but Ben Slade is incredulous and does not see why Jeffords did not kill the Apache boy. Instead, Jeffords learns the Apache language and customs and plans to go to Cochise's stronghold on behalf of his friend, Milt, who is in charge of the mail service in Tucson. Jeffords enters the Apache stronghold and begins a parley with Cochise, who agrees to let the couriers through. Jeffords meets a young Apache girl, Sonseeahray, and falls in love.

A few of Cochise's warriors attack an army wagon train and kill the survivors. The townsfolk nearly lynch Jeffords as a traitor before he is saved by General Oliver Otis Howard who recruits Jeffords to negotiate peace with Cochise. Howard, the "Christian General" condemns racism, saying that the Bible "says nothing about pigmentation of the skin". Jeffords makes a peace treaty with Cochise, but a group led by Geronimo, oppose the treaty and leave the stronghold. When these renegades ambush a stagecoach, Jeffords rides off to seek help from Cochise and the stagecoach is saved.

Jeffords and Sonseeahray marry in an Apache ceremony and have several days of tranquility. Later, Ben Slade's son spins a story to Jeffords and Cochise about two of his horses stolen by Cochise's people. Cochise says that his people did not take them and doubts his story, as he knows the boy's father is an Apache hater. They then decide to go along with the boy up the canyon, but are ambushed by the boy's father and a gang of men from Tucson. Jeffords is badly wounded and Sonseeahray is killed, but Cochise kills most of the men, including Ben Slade. Cochise forbids Jeffords to retaliate, saying that the ambush was not done by the military and that Geronimo broke the peace no less than Slade and his men, and that peace must be maintained. General Howard arrives with some of the townsfolk, and informs Jeffords and Cochise that the men who survived the ambush and fled have been captured and will be executed for their crime, and the townsfolk offer their condolences and apologies. Jeffords rides off with the belief that "the death of Sonseeahray had put a seal upon the peace, and from that day on wherever I went, in the cities, among the Apaches and in the mountains, I always remembered, my wife was with me".

Cast
 James Stewart as Tom Jeffords
 Jeff Chandler as Cochise
 Debra Paget as Sonseeahray
 Basil Ruysdael as Gen. Oliver Howard
 Will Geer as Ben Slade
 Joyce MacKenzie as Terry
 Arthur Hunnicutt as Milt Duffield
 Jay Silverheels as Geronimo

Production
Producer Julius Blaustein recalled: "We had a terrible time locating an actor with the proper voice and stature to play Cochise. Before we found Chandler we were even considering Ezio Pinza".

Jeff Chandler was cast in May 1949 on the basis of his performance in Sword in the Desert. He was working in several radio series at the time, Michael Shayne and Our Miss Brooks, and had to be written out of them for several weeks.

Filming started on June 6, 1949. It was primarily shot on location in northern Arizona, approximately 30 miles south of Flagstaff. Apaches from the Whiteriver agency on the Fort Apache Indian Reservation played themselves. Debra Paget was only 15 years old when she played the love interest to 42-year-old James Stewart. Canadian Mohawk actor Jay Silverheels portrayed Geronimo.

The film was based on the 558-page novel Blood Brother (1947) by Elliott Arnold, which told the story of the peace agreement between the Apache leader Cochise and the U.S. Army, 1855–1874. The studio employed nearly 240 Indians from Arizona's Fort Apache Indian Reservation; many location scenes were shot in Sedona, Arizona. The story of Cochise actually occurred in what is now the Dragoon Mountains in the Douglas Ranger District of the Coronado National Forest in southeastern Arizona.  The studio attempted to portray Apache customs in the film, like the Social Dance and the Girl's Sunrise Ceremony (the girl's puberty rite). For the character of Cochise, director Daves eliminated the traditional style of broken English and replaced it with conventional English so that whites and Indians would sound alike.

Portrayal of Indians
Although many westerns of the pre-World War II period portrayed American Indians as hostile to the European settlers, others did show Indians in a positive light. Broken Arrow is noteworthy for being one of the first post-war westerns to portray Native Americans in a balanced, sympathetic way. However, most of the Indians were played by European American actors, with Brooklyn-born Jeff Chandler portraying Apache leader Cochise. An exception was that Native Canadian Mohawk actor Jay Silverheels was noted for his role as Geronimo in the film.

Some scholars have said that the film appealed to an ideal of tolerance and racial equality that would influence later westerns and indicate Hollywood's response to the Indian's evolving role in American society. Chronicle of the Cinema praised the film: "Based on verifiable fact, it faithfully evokes the historical relationship between Cochise and Jeffords, marking a historical rehabilitation of Indians in the cinema".

In 1950, Rosebud Yellow Robe, a Native American folklorist, educator, and author, was hired by 20th Century Fox to undertake a national tour to promote the film. Yellow Robe explained that there were no such things as Indian princesses, and that the myth started when Pocahontas went to England and the English named her "Lady Rebecca". Yellow Robe voiced complaints about the portrayals of Indians on radio, screen, and television to "a new generation of children learning the old stereotypes about whooping, warring Indians, as if there weren't anything else interesting about us".

The Apache Wedding Prayer

The Apache Wedding Prayer was written for this film.

Awards and honors
 Best Supporting Actor (nomination) — Jeff Chandler
 Academy Award for Writing Adapted Screenplay (nomination) — Albert Maltz (front: Michael Blankfort) from the novel Blood Brother by Elliott Arnold
 Academy Award for Best Cinematography, color (nomination) — Ernest Palmer

The film is recognized by American Film Institute in the 2008 list, AFI's 10 Top 10: Nominated Western Film

Adaptations to other media
Broken Arrow was dramatized as an hour-long Lux Radio Theatre radio play on January 22, 1951, starring Burt Lancaster (replacing an ill James Stewart) and Debra Paget. It was also presented as a half-hour broadcast of Screen Directors Playhouse on September 7, 1951, with James Stewart and Jeff Chandler in their original film roles. The film and novel also provided the basis for a television series of the same name that ran from 1956 through 1958, starring Michael Ansara as Cochise and John Lupton as Jeffords.

Cultural references
 The movie's world premiere was held at the Roxy, New York City.
 The Blackfoot Indians would use a broken arrow to signal that they would cease fighting.
 After watching the film, Colombian cyclist Martín Emilio Rodríguez adopted the nickname "Cochise" from the character of the film he liked the most.

See also
 List of American films of 1950
 Broken Arrow, an accidental event that involves nuclear weapons
 Broken Arrow, a 1996 action-thriller film involving such an incident

References

Notes
 Aleiss, Angela, Making the White Man's Indian: Native Americans and Hollywood Movies, London & CT: Praeger, 2005; 
 Karney, Robyn (editor), Chronicle of the Cinema; London: Dorling Kindersley, 1995; 
 Lenihan, John H. Showdown: Confronting Modern America in the Western Film, Urbana: University of Illinois Press, 1980; 
 O'Conner, John E. & Peter C. Rollins, eds. Hollywood's Indian: The Portrayal of the Native American in Film [Paperback], The University Press of Kentucky, 2003;

External links
 
 
 

1950 films
1950 Western (genre) films
20th Century Fox films
American Western (genre) films
Western (genre) cavalry films
Films about Native Americans
Apache Wars films
1950s English-language films
Films adapted into comics
Films based on American novels
Films based on Western (genre) novels
Films directed by Delmer Daves
Films scored by Hugo Friedhofer
Films shot in Arizona
Films set in Arizona
Films set in the 1860s
Revisionist Western (genre) films
1950s American films